Major Sudhir Kumar Walia, AC, ADC, SM & Bar (24 May 1969 – 29 August 1999), was an officer of the Indian Army, who served in the elite 9 Para (SF). He was posthumously awarded the Ashoka Chakra, India's highest peacetime military decoration, by the then President, late K. R. Narayan, in January 2000.

Early life
Sudhir was born in a Kalal family on 24 May 1969 in Banuri, a village in the Kangra district in Himachal Pradesh, to an Army veteran Subedar Major Rulia Ram Walia and Smt. Rajeswari Devi. He attended the Sainik School at Sujanpur Tihra.
He then gained admission into the National Defence Academy, Khadakwasla.

Army career
Sudhir graduated from the Indian Military Academy and was commissioned as a second lieutenant in the 4th Battalion, The Jat Regiment on 11 June 1988. He was a member of the Indian Peace Keeping Force (IPKF), who were sent to Sri Lanka on a peace mission. After he returned from Sri Lanka, he opted for the 9th Battalion, Para (SF), a special forces unit of the Indian Army that specializes in mountain operations. He also served two six-month terms at the Siachen Glacier. He was promoted as a lieutenant on 11 June 1990.  

Walia was promoted as a captain on 11 June 1993,  and was awarded the Sena Medal in 1994 on two occasions for his gallantry while combating militancy in Jammu and Kashmir. In 1997, he was sent to the United States for a specialized course and got the first position. He also spoke at the Pentagon during this mission. For his competence, he was respectfully called 'Colonel' during that course.

He was later deputed as an Aide-de-camp (ADC) to the then Chief of the Army Staff (COAS), General Ved Prakash Malik. When the Kargil War broke out, he obtained a special permission from the COAS to go to the battlefield. Within ten days of his departure from Delhi, he led his team to capture Zulu Top at 5200 metres, in the Mushkoh Valley sector. When asked about his attack on Zulu Top without needing to acclimatize, Major Sudhir said: "Sir, you know that I'm a pahari (from the mountains). I don't need acclimatization."

After the Kargil War ended, his team was assigned the duty of fighting terrorism in Jammu and Kashmir.

On 29 August 1999, he led an assault on a militant hideout in the Haphruda jungles of Kupwara district in Jammu and Kashmir. He killed 9 of the 20 militants present, and sustained several gunshot wounds in the process. Though he was unable to move, he continued to give orders to his team till they succeeded. He allowed himself to be evacuated only 35 minutes after the operation ended. He was airlifted to an Army hospital but succumbed to the injuries en route. For his bravery, he was posthumously awarded the Ashoka Chakra, the highest peacetime military decoration in India.

References

1969 births
1999 deaths
Recipients of the Ashoka Chakra (military decoration)
People from Kangra district
Para Commandos
Indian Military Academy alumni
National Defence Academy (India) alumni
Recipients of the Sena Medal
Ashoka Chakra
Ahluwalia